Jadu Zehi Buhir (also Romanized as Jādū Zehī Būhīr) is a village in Polan Rural District, Polan District, Chabahar County, Sistan and Baluchestan Province, Iran. At the 2006 census, its population was 139, in 31 families.

References 

Populated places in Chabahar County